The 2009–10 Boston Bruins season was the Bruins' 86th season in the National Hockey League (NHL). Their regular season began with a nationally-televised home game against the Washington Capitals on October 1, 2009, and ended with a road game against the same Capitals team on April 11, 2010. The Bruins failed to defend their regular-season division and conference titles from the 2008–09 season.

Off-season 
At the 2009 NHL Entry Draft, the Bruins chose Jordan Caron with their first-round pick, 25th overall. The NHL announced on July 15, 2009, that the Bruins would face the Philadelphia Flyers in the 2010 NHL Winter Classic on New Year's Day at Fenway Park.

Due to salary cap constraints and free agent movement, general manager Peter Chiarelli made substantial changes to the Bruins' lineup in the offseason. Most notable was the trade of leading goalscorer Phil Kessel, who declined contract offers and was traded to the Toronto Maple Leafs for three draft picks on September 18.  Other departures included winger P. J. Axelsson—at 11 seasons, the longest tenured Bruin—center Stephane Yelle, defensemen Shane Hnidy and Steve Montador, and goaltender Manny Fernandez.  These veteran players were considered expendable due to competition from younger, lower-paid players in the Bruins organization.

Chiarelli entered the 2009 off-season with the goal of acquiring an offensive-minded defenseman, in part due to Boston's weakness in that area during the previous playoffs.  On July 24, defenseman Derek Morris signed a one-year contract with the team.  Gritty forward Steve Begin was also signed to provide forward depth. In goal, Fernandez was replaced with rookie Tuukka Rask, who had spent several seasons playing in the American Hockey League (AHL).

Pre-season

Regular season 
The Bruins were slow to gain traction with their retooled roster, alternating wins and losses in the early weeks of the season.  Chiarelli quickly dealt popular winger Chuck Kobasew to the Minnesota Wild, while penalty-killing expert Daniel Paille was brought in from the Buffalo Sabres in exchange for draft picks, a move that was interpreted as a sign of dissatisfaction with the team's productivity.

In particular, the team struggled offensively in Kessel's absence.  Having nearly finished first in scoring the previous season, the Bruins lingered near the bottom of the league in goal production.  However, they were able to stay competitive due to their exceptional defense and strong goaltending tandem.  While defending Vezina Trophy winner Tim Thomas was recovering from an early injury, rookie netminder Tuukka Rask emerged as a potential Calder Memorial Trophy candidate.  A four-game winning streak in November set the Bruins back on course, and a 5–1–0 home record in December got them back into the divisional race by Christmas.

Perhaps the most memorable game of the season was the Winter Classic, which the Bruins hosted at Fenway Park in Boston.  Despite trailing for most of the game, the team rallied in the final moments and won in overtime before a large national audience.  After the game, Thomas was announced as a member of the United States men's hockey team, joining five teammates (Patrice Bergeron, Zdeno Chara, Marco Sturm, David Krejci and Miroslav Satan) who would represent various countries in Vancouver.

The Bruins went on a long losing streak lasting from mid-January to just before the Olympic break.

In the 81st game of the season, the Bruins scored three shorthanded goals in a span of 64 seconds. This outburst during a single penalty kill not only equaled their previous shorthanded goal total for the entire season, it was a NHL record for the fastest three shorthanded goals during a game. The 4–2 victory over the Hurricanes secured a playoff spot for the Bruins.

The Bruins finished the regular season having scored 196 goals (excluding 10 shootout-winning goals), the fewest in the NHL. They were the most disciplined team in the League, with a league-low 37 power-play goals against.

Divisional standings

Conference standings

Game log

Playoffs 
The Bruins clinched a playoff spot for the third consecutive season.

Playoff log

 Scorer of game-winning goal in italics
 *Denotes if necessary

Player statistics

Skaters
Note: GP = Games played; G = Goals; A = Assists; Pts = Points; +/- = Plus-minus; PIM = Penalty minutes

†Denotes player spent time with another team before joining Bruins. Stats reflect time with the Bruins only.
‡Denotes player was traded mid-season.
(G)Denotes goaltender.

Goaltenders
Note: GPI = Games Played In; MIN = Minutes played; GAA = Goals against average; W = Wins; L = Losses; OT = Overtime/shootout losses; SO = Shutouts; SA = Shots Against; GA = Goals against; SV% = Save percentage

Awards and records

Awards

On April 8, prior to the game against the Buffalo Sabres, the team announced its award winners for the season.

Milestones

On December 23, Claude Julien coached his 200th game for Boston, a 6–4 win over Atlanta.

Transactions
The Bruins have been involved in the following transactions during the 2009–10 season.

Trades

Free agents acquired

Free agents lost

Player signings

Draft picks 

Boston's picks at the 2009 NHL Entry Draft in Montreal, Quebec.

Farm teams 

American Hockey League – Providence Bruins (standings)

See also 

 2009–10 NHL season

Notes

References

External links 
2009–10 Boston Bruins season at ESPN
2009–10 Boston Bruins season at Hockey Reference

Boston Bruins seasons
Boston Bruins
Boston Bruins
Boston Bruins
Boston Bruins
Bruins
Bruins